Dorothy Jean Ray (October 10, 1919 – December 12, 2007) was an author and anthropologist best known for her study of Native Alaskan art and culture.

In addition to a number of published books, she has had articles and papers published in Alaska History, Alaska Journal, Alaska, American Indian Art, Arctic Anthropology, Journal of the West, Pacific Northwest Quarterly, and others.

She received honorary doctorates from the University of Alaska Fairbanks and her alma mater, the University of Northern Iowa. Additional honors include the Dorothy Jean Ray Anthropology Scholarship at the University of Northern Iowa.

Some of her lifetime collection of artifacts are now part of the University of Alaska Museum Fairbanks' collection. Her book A Legacy of Arctic Art has been described as being both a catalog of the collection, and a memoir of the author's lengthy career.

She was married to fellow anthropologist and author Verne F. Ray.

Books
A Legacy of Arctic Art – 1996 
The Eskimos of Bering Strait, 1650-1898 – 1992 
Aleut and Eskimo Art – 1986 
Ethnohistory in the Arctic: The Bering Strait Eskimo – 1983 
Artists of the Tundra and the Sea – 1980 
Eskimo Art: Tradition and Innovation in North Alaska – 1977 
Eskimo Masks: Art and Ceremony – 1975

References

On-line version of Ray's article "The Billiken" originally published in The Alaska Journal (Winter 1974)
Amazon.com reprint of editorial review of A Legacy of Arctic Art by Library Journal

External links
On-line copy of her paper "The Eskimo and the Land: Ownership and Utilization" presented at the Thirteenth Alaskan Science Conference, August 25, 1962, Juneau, Alaska.
 Three Accounts of the Vasilev-Shishmarev Expedition of 1819-1822 Collection at Dartmouth College Library

American art historians
Women art historians
1919 births
2007 deaths
American women historians
20th-century American anthropologists
20th-century American non-fiction writers
20th-century American women writers
21st-century American women